is a national highway connecting Tokyo and Shiojiri, Nagano prefecture in Japan. Originating at Nihonbashi in Chūō, Tokyo, it passes through Shinjuku and four other wards, and then seven cities, including Hachiōji in Tokyo. It follows a westward route into Kanagawa Prefecture, passing through the city of Sagamihara and one town. Continuing into Yamanashi Prefecture, the highway passes through nine cities and towns, among them the prefectural capital of Kofu. In Nagano Prefecture, National Route 20 passes through five cities and towns before entering Shiojiri, where it terminates at the intersection of National Routes 19 and 153. The highway is 225.0 km long.

National Route 20 is the successor to the Kōshū Kaidō, an Edo period highway connecting the shogunal capital of Edo and Kofu, then the principal city in Kai Province (or Kōshū, as it was also known). Parts of it still bear the old name.

The highway's course passes the Sakurada Gate of the Tokyo Imperial Palace. Shinjuku Station is on National Route 20. The marathon course of the Tokyo Olympics included parts of National Route 20.

History
4 December 1952 - First Class National Highway 20 (from Tokyo to Shiojiri, Nagano)
1 April 1965 - General National Highway 20 (from Tokyo to Shiojiri, Nagano)

Overlapping sections
From Nihonbashi to Chiyoda (Sakuradamon intersection): Route 1
In Hachioji, from Yokamachi intersection to Hachimancho intersection: Route 16
In Otsuki, from  intersection to Otsuki-bashi east intersection: Route 139
From Kai (Ryuo-rittai intersection) to Nirasaki (Funayama-bashi kita intersection): Route 52

Intersects with

Tokyo
Routes 4 and 15; at the origin, in Nihonbashi (Route 4 overlaps with 6, 14 and  17)
Route 1; from Nihonbashi to Chiyoda
Route 246; at Chiyoda
Chofu IC, Chuo Expressway at Chōfu
Kunitachi-Fuchu IC, Chuo Expressway at Kunitachi
Route 16; at Hachioji
Kanagawa Prefecture
Route 412 and Sagamiko-Higashi Exit, Chuo Expressway; at Sagamihara
Sagamiko IC, Chuo Expressway at Sagamihara
Yamanashi Prefecture
Route 139 and Otsuki IC, Chuo Expressway; at Otsuki
Route 137; at Fuefuki
Routes 140 and 358; at Kofu
Route 52; from Kai to Nirasaki
Route 141; at Nirasaki
Nagano Prefecture
Routes 152 and 299; at Chino
Route 142; at Shimosuwa
Routes 19 and 153; at the terminus, in Shiojiri

References

020
Roads in Kanagawa Prefecture
Roads in Nagano Prefecture
Roads in Tokyo
Roads in Yamanashi Prefecture